Facheiroa is a genus of cacti that is endemic to Brazil.

Species
It is comprised by 8 species in the 2 subgenera of Facheiroa and Zehntnerella.

Species include: 

The genus Zehntnerella (Britton & Rose) has been reclassified into this genus, to become a subgenus of it.

References

External links
 
 

 
Cacti of South America
Endemic flora of Brazil
Cactoideae genera